Roha railway station (station code: ROHA) is the terminus railway station on the Panvel–Roha route of Central Railway in India. It is 143.61 km from Chhatrapati Shivaji Terminus via . It belongs to the Mumbai division of Central Railway.

The station is situated in Raigad district of Maharashtra. The jurisdiction of Central Railway ends 1170 m down from Roha railway station.

From that point, the jurisdiction of Konkan Railways starts and ends at Thokur railway station in Karnataka. Roha Diva Memu originated & terminated from Roha Railway station Under the operated By Central Railway

References

Railway stations in Raigad district
Ratnagiri railway division
Panvel-Roha rail line
Mumbai CR railway division
Railway stations opened in 1986
Railway stations along Konkan Railway line
Mumbai Suburban Railway stations